Loretta Hogan Rush (born May 11, 1958) is an American lawyer and judge who has served as an associate justice of the Indiana Supreme Court since 2012 and as Chief Justice since 2014.

Early life and education 
Rush was born in 1958 in Scranton, Pennsylvania. She settled in Indiana in 1972. She earned her undergraduate degree from Purdue University and her Juris Doctor from the Indiana University Maurer School of Law in Bloomington, Indiana.

Career 
Rush spent 15 years in general practice as an associate and then partner at the Lafayette, Indiana firm of Dickson, Reiling, Teder and Withered. Her practice consisted of civil litigation, family law, business, personal injury, corporate, probate and workers compensation cases. Prior to her appointment to the Indiana Supreme Court, she was elected Tippecanoe Superior Court 3 judge and served for 14 years. As juvenile court judge in Tippecanoe County she assisted with the creation of the county's Court Appointed Special Advocate (CASA) program. She also implemented a certified juvenile drug treatment court, and initiated a twenty-four-hour assessment center for youth.

Indiana Supreme Court
Rush was appointed to the Indiana Supreme Court by Governor Mitch Daniels in September 2012. She took the oath of office as Indiana's 108th Supreme Court Justice on November 7, 2012. She became Chief Justice on August 18, 2014. She is Indiana's first female chief justice.

Rush is a member of the Tippecanoe, Indiana, Indianapolis, Seventh Circuit and American Bar Association's Indiana and National Council of Juvenile and Family Court Judges.

Awards 
In 2003, she was awarded the Kinsey Award for Juvenile Judge of the Year and was presented with the Fiscal Responsibility Award by the Tippecanoe County Council and Commissioners in 2001. In 2013 she was selected as one of Indianapolis Business Journal's 2013 "Women of Influence."

See also

List of justices of the Indiana Supreme Court

References

External links

 Biography at Indiana Supreme Court

1958 births
Living people
20th-century American lawyers
21st-century American judges
21st-century American women judges
20th-century American women lawyers
Chief Justices of the Indiana Supreme Court
Indiana lawyers
Justices of the Indiana Supreme Court
Indiana University Maurer School of Law alumni
Pennsylvania lawyers
People from Scranton, Pennsylvania
Purdue University alumni
Women chief justices of state supreme courts in the United States